John Primrose may refer to:
John Primrose, 4th Laird of Burnbrae (1590–1669)
John Primrose, 5th Laird of Burnbrae (c.1617-?)
John Primrose, 8th Laird of Burnbrae (c.1719-?)
Sir John Ure Primrose, 1st Baronet (1847–1924) Lord Provost of Glasgow 1900-05
Sir John Ure Primrose, 3rd Baronet (1908–1985)
Sir John Ure Primrose, 5th Baronet (b. 1960)
John Primrose (brewer) (c. 1803–1876) founder of South Australia's first successful brewery
John Primrose (sport shooter), Canadian Olympic sport shooter